"Tonight" is a song recorded by The Move and was written by Roy Wood originally for pop vocal group The New Seekers. Released in 1971, The Move's version was their first single release on the Harvest label, and charted at number 11 on the UK Singles Chart. In Denmark, it charted at number seven. The song peaked at number 89 in Australia.

Jeff Lynne, who had joined the group the previous year, took lead vocal on the third verse.

The single was issued in the US on Capitol. The United Artists reissue 45 was issued as the single for their 1972 Split Ends compilation.

References

Song recordings produced by Roy Wood
Song recordings produced by Jeff Lynne
The Move songs
1971 singles
Songs written by Roy Wood
Harvest Records singles
United Artists Records singles
1971 songs